Christoph Ransmayr (born 20 March 1954) is an Austrian writer.

Life 

Born in Wels, Upper Austria, Ransmayr grew up in Roitham near Gmunden and the Traunsee. From 1972 to 1978 he studied philosophy and ethnology in Vienna. He worked there as cultural editor for the newspaper Extrablatt from 1978 to 1982, also publishing articles and essays in GEO, TransAtlantik and Merian. After his novel Die letzte Welt was published in 1988, he traveled extensively across Ireland, Asia, North and South America. This is reflected in his works, where he looks at life as a tourist and believes that good writing needs ignorance, speechlessness, light luggage, curiosity, or at least a willingness not only to judge the world, but to experience it. In 1994 he moved to West Cork, Ireland, as a friend offered to lease him a splendid house on the Atlantic coast for a very affordable rent.

In his prose, Ransmayr combines historical facts with fiction. His novels portray cross-border experiences and weave historical events with the present time. The combination of exciting plots and demanding forms in his first two novels brought him praise, attention from literary studies, and numerous literary prizes.

Ransmayr achieved international success with his novel The Last World (1988), a rewrite of Ovid’s Metamorphoses. His novel Morbus Kitahara (1995) is named after an eye disease which leads to an increasing narrowing of the field of vision. It is a metaphor for the moral defect afflicting the main characters, survivors of World War II, in a devastated no man's land.

In 1997 Ransmayr read his short story Die dritte Luft oder Eine Bühne am Meer, written for this occasion, as a keynote speech for the Salzburg Festival.
After his marriage in the Spring of 2006 Ransmayr returned to live in Vienna. His play Odysseus, Verbrecher was performed in Dortmund as part of the RUHR.2010 events.

In 2018 he received the Nicolas Born Prize for his literary works to date.

Awards 

1986–1988 Elias Canetti Fellowship, see also Elias Canetti
1988 Anton Wildgans Prize
1992 Großer Literaturpreis der Bayerischen Akademie der Schönen Künste
1995 Franz-Kafka-Preis, see also Franz Kafka
1995 Franz Nabl Prize
1996 Aristeion Prize for the novel Morbus Kitahara
1997 Solothurner Literaturpreis
1997 Kulturpreis des Landes Oberösterreich
1998 Friedrich-Hölderlin-Preis
2001 Nestroy Theatre Prize, see also Johann Nestroy
2004 Bertolt-Brecht-Literaturpreis
2004 Großer Österreichischer Staatspreis für Literatur
2010 28° Preis Gambrinus "Giuseppe Mazzotti"
2013 Donauland Sachbuchpreis
2013 Ernst-Toller-Preis
2013 Brothers Grimm Prize of the City of Hanau for Atlas of an Anxious Man
2014 Fontane Prize of the City of Neuruppin for Atlas of an Anxious Man
2015 Prix Jean Monnet de Littérature Européenne for Atlas of an Anxious Man
2015 Prix du Meilleur livre étranger for Atlas of an Anxious Man
2018 Nicolas Born Prize for his literary works to date
2018 Kleist Prize

Bibliography 

Strahlender Untergang, together with Willy Puchner, 1982, 
Die Schrecken des Eises und der Finsternis, 1984, 
Die letzte Welt, 1988, 
Morbus Kitahara, 1995, 
Der Weg nach Surabaya, 1997, 
Die dritte Luft, oder Eine Bühne am Meer, 1997, 
Die Unsichtbare. Tirade an drei Stränden, 2001, 
Der Ungeborene, oder Die Himmelsareale des Anselm Kiefer, 2002, 
Die Verbeugung des Riesen. Vom Erzählen, 2003, 
Geständnisse eines Touristen. Ein Verhör, 2004, 
Der fliegende Berg, 2006, 
Damen & Herren unter Wasser, together with Manfred Wakolbinger, 2007, 
Odysseus, Verbrecher. Schauspiel einer Heimkehr, 2010, 
Der Wolfsjäger. Drei polnische Duette, together with Martin Pollack, 2011, 
Atlas eines ängstlichen Mannes, 2012, 
Gerede: Elf Ansprachen, 2014, 
Cox oder Der Lauf der Zeit, 2016, 
Der Fallmeister. Eine kurze Geschichte vom Töten., 2021,

English editions 

The Terrors of Ice and Darkness, 1991, translated by John E. Woods, 
The Last World, 1991, translated by John E. Woods, 
The Dog King, 1997, translated by John E. Woods, 
Atlas of an Anxious Man, 2016, translated by Simon Pare, 
The Flying Mountain, 2018, translated by Simon Pare,

References

External links 

 
Library of Congress, New Literature from Europe, May 1998
S. Fischer Verlag, his publisher 

1954 births
Austrian male writers
Living people
Anton Wildgans Prize winners
Kleist Prize winners
Austrian science fiction writers